Fabio Mengozzi (born May 12, 1980, in Asti) is an Italian composer and pianist.

Biography

Fabio Mengozzi studied piano with Aldo Ciccolini, orchestral conducting and composition, masterclasses with Azio Corghi at the Accademia Nazionale di Santa Cecilia in Rome.

He won several awards including: 2nd prize at “11° Concorso Pianistico Nazionale Città di Genova" (1991); 1st prize at "3° Concorso Nazionale per Giovani Pianisti Comune di Terzo d'Acqui" (1991); 1st prize at "1° Concorso Nazionale Riviera dei fiori Città di Alassio" (1992); 1st prize at "XIII Concorso Pianistico Nazionale Città di Genova" (1992); 1st prize at "Concorso Musicale Europeo Città di Moncalieri" (1992); 1st prize at "2° Concorso Nazionale di Musica per borse di studio di Tortona" (1992); 1st prize at "7° Concorso Nazionale di Esecuzione Musicale Franz Schubert in Tagliolo Monferrato" (1992); 2nd prize at "3° Concorso Nazionale di Musica per giovani interpreti Città di Asti" (1992); 2nd prize at "1° Concorso Pianistico Italiano Premio Città di Cortemilia" (1993); 2nd prize at "4° Concorso Pianistico Nazionale Carlo Vidusso in Milano" (1994); 1st prize at "Concorso Pianistico Nazionale Lorenzo Perosi in Tortona" (1996); 1st prize at "Primo Concorso Pianistico Regionale Cortile Casa Lodigiani di Alessandria" (1996); finalist at "6° Concorso Nazionale di Composizione Rosolino Toscano" (Pescara, 2002); finalist at "Concorso di Composizione Franco Evangelisti" (Roma, 2003); 2nd prize at "Concorso Nazionale di Composizione Mozart Oggi 2005" (Milano, 2006); 2nd prize at "Concorso Internazionale di Composizione per Strumenti a Percussione" (Fermo, 2006); finalist at "Progetto Giovani Compositori Incontro con le musiche" (Forlì, 2007); finalist at "IV Rassegna dei Migliori Diplomati d'Italia" (Castrocaro Terme e Terra del Sole, 2000); 3rd prize at Michele Pittaluga International Composition Competition (Alessandria, 2010).

His music has been performed in Algeria, Austria, Argentina, Brazil, Belgium, Canada, Chile, China, Croatia, Denmark, Estonia, France, Germany, Greece, Haiti, the Netherlands, Iceland, India, Iran, Ireland, Israel, Italy, Japan, Montenegro, Poland, Portugal, Russia, Serbia, Slovenia, South Africa, Spain, Switzerland, Ukraine, United Kingdom, United States by interpreters including Marco Angius, Francesco Attesti, Assia Cunego, Alpaslan Ertüngealp, Nicolas Horvath, Flavio Emilio Scogna, Antidogma Musica, Orchestra i Pomeriggi Musicali, at festivals and theatres among which Winchester Modern Gallery (Victoria, Canada), Royal Danish Academy of Music (Copenhagen, Denmark), Saint Petersburg Conservatory (Russia), Palm Beach Atlantic University (U.S.), Casa Italiana Zerilli-Marimò (U.S.), Erateio Odeio Conservatory (Athen, Greece), Kadriorg Palace (Tallinn, Estonia), Trivandrum Centre for Performing Arts (India), Karol Lipiński Academy of Music (Wrocław, Poland), Ilija M. Kolarac Endowment (Belgrade, Serbia), Florentinersaal (Graz, Austria), National Gallery of Iceland (Reykjavík, Iceland), Gloucester Cathedral (England), St Michael at the North Gate (Oxford, England), Palais de Tokyo (Paris), St. James's Parish Church (Ljubljana), Ein Karem (Jerusalem), Protestant Temple in Collioure, Strand Theater (Zelienople, Pennsylvania), Sala Accademica del Conservatorio Santa Cecilia (Rome), Spazio Espositivo Tritone (Rome), MITO SettembreMusica, Stagione Sinfonica dell'Orchestra i Pomeriggi Musicali, Nuova Consonanza, Rassegna di Musica Antica e Contemporanea Antidogma, Aegean Arts International Festival (Crete, Greece), University of Minnesota Duluth New Music Festival (U.S.), La Nuit du Piano Minimaliste (Collioure), Gli Amici di Musica/Realtà (Milano), Festival Verdi Off (Parma), Unione Culturale Franco Antonicelli (Turin), Teatro Piccolo Regio Giacomo Puccini (Turin), Conservatory of Turin, Turin Cathedral, Palazzo Saluzzo di Paesana (Turin), Auditorium Vivaldi at Turin National University Library, Palazzina Liberty (Milan), Teatro Dal Verme (Milan), Liceo Musicale Angelo Masini (Forlì), Teatro Vittorio Alfieri (Asti), Casa della Musica (Parma), Auditorium Parco della Musica (Rome), Sala Ciampi (Rome), Villa del Vascello (Rome), Conservatory of Vicenza, Giardino Bellini (Catania), Casa della Musica at Conservatory of Cosenza.

His compositions have been published by Bèrben Edizioni Musicali, Edizioni Sconfinarte and Taukay Edizioni Musicali.

Music

Even though Fabio Mengozzi's work has often been characterized by a dream-like and seemingly Neo-romantic atmosphere, it is deeply marked by a philosophical and numerological perspective. Such a peculiarity has many times earned the author the original title of Pythagorean composer in the contemporary music scene.

Selected discography
 Italy, CD harpAcademy (2014)
 Mistero e poesia (disco monografico), CD Stradivarius (2018)
 A Mario Castelnuovo-Tedesco, Music by Castelnuovo-Tedesco – Scapecchi – Mengozzi, CD Editions Habanera (2019)
 Romanza alla Terra (single), pianist Anna Sutyagina (2021)
 Melodia lunare V (single), pianist Anna Sutyagina (2021)
 Orpheus (single), CD SMC Records (2022)
 Romanza alla Terra (electronic single) (2022)
 Via crucis (album) (2022)
 Musica con creta (album) (2023)

Works

Chamber music
 Trio (2001) for flute, oboe and piano
 Sezioni di suono (2003) for percussion quartet
 Elegia (2004) for two violas and piano
 Interferenze (2004) for flute, clarinet, cello, piano and percussion
 Ricercare (2004) for violin, cello and piano
 I cerchi concentrici (2006) for piano and percussion
 Naos (2006) for viola e piano
 Mirrors (2010) for guitar and string quartet
 Lied (2010) for clarinet choir
 Sonata per arpa e percussione (2010)
 Arabesque (2011) for harp
 Diario d'arpa (2011) for harp
 Dieci frammenti celesti (2012) for prepared piano
 Poema della trasmigrazione (2012) for harp
 Romanza al cielo (2012) for harp
 Rosa (2012) for harp
 Crux (2012) for harp
 Symbolon (2012) for two harps
 Segreta luce (2013) for piano
 Ascensio ad lucem (2013) for piano
 Spire (2013) for piano
 Le rêve de l'échelle (2013) for clarinet choir
 Novella (2013) for harp or celtic harp
 Mysterium (2013) for piano
 Moto fluttuante (2014) for harp
 Phoenix (2014) for violin and harp
 Circulata melodia (2014) for piano
 Oltrepassando il valico (2014) for piano
 Veli (2014) for piano
 Commiato (2014) for piano
 Poema della luce (2014) for piano
 Poema litico (2015) for piano four hands 
 Sub vesperum (2015) for piano four hands
 Anelito al silenzio (2015) for piano
 Reverie IV (2015) for piano
 Larus (2015) for violin, viola, cello and piano
 Artifex (2015) for piano
 Faro notturno (2015) for piano
 Horizon (2015) for piano
 Kairos (2015) for piano
 Nauta (2015) for piano
 Ianus (2015) for piano
 Ananke (2016) for piano
 Era (2016) for piano
 Romanza alla Terra (2016) for piano
 Reame (2016) for piano
 Lettera (2016) for piano
 Meteora (2016) for two pianos
 Promenade (2016) for piano six hands
 Flos coeli (2016) for piano
 Ceruleo vagare (2017) for piano
 Cometa nella notte (2017) for piano
 Estro (2017) for piano
 Rivo di cenere (2017) for piano
 Scintilla (2017) for piano
 Sempiterna ruota (2017) for piano
 Sfinge (2017) for piano
 Viride (2017) for piano
 Sorgente I (2018) for flute and piano
 Ousia (2018) for harp and piano
 Ousia II (2018) for flute, cello, harp and piano
 Delta (2018) for string quartet
 Romanza alla Terra II (2018) for flute and piano
 Melodia lunare (2018) for English horn
 Melodia lunare II (2018) for oboe
 Fantasia (2018) for guitar and piano
 Fiat lux (2018) for organ
 Auriga (2018) for harp and piano
 Auriga II (2019) for pianoforte, harp and string orchestra
 Ora (2019) for flute and cello
 SATOR (2019) for soprano and string quartet
 Pavana (2020) for two alto flutes and bass flute
 Solo (2020) for trombone
 Tre incantazioni (2020) for flute
 Vision (2020) for English horn, bassoon and piano
 Raggio (2020) for clarinet
 Agli albori (2020) for soprano and viola
 Aria dell'aria (2020) for Native American flute
 Claro (2020) for two clarinets
 Oasi (2020) for flute
 Rest in peace (2020) for soprano, flute and piano
 Melodia lunare III (2020) for flute
 Melodia lunare IV (2020) for tenor saxophone
 Melodia lunare V (2020) for piano
 Eclipse (2020) for soprano saxophone
 Autunno, petali sopiti nel vento (2021) for harp
 Primavera, stormi frementi nel silenzio del tramonto (2021) for harp
 Estate, luce di stelle nella notte (2021) for harp
 Inverno, neve cadente nel gelo dell'alba (2021) for harp
 Monodia cosmica (2021) for violin
 Ailes (2021) for ocarina
 Antica ocarina (2021) for ocarina

Orchestral
 Vortici, affetti e un'evocazione (2005) for orchestra
 Secretum (2016) for string orchestra
 Constructores (2017) for string orchestra
 Aurora (2018) for chamber orchestra

Choral
 Hortus conclusus (2004) for women's choir
 Da una terra antica (2008) for mixed choir
 Gan Naul (2013) for women's choir

Electronic
 The woman clothed with the sun (2022) 
 Orpheus (2022) 
 Delle vette e degli abissi (2022) for tenor saxophone and electronic 
 Romanza alla Terra (2022) 
 Via crucis (2022)
 Musica con creta (2023)

References

External links
  
 
 
 Fabio Mengozzi on Facebook
 Artist's Spotify page

20th-century classical composers
21st-century classical composers
Italian composers
1980 births
Living people
People from Asti